Richard or Dick Walsh may refer to:
Richard Walsh (actor) (born 1952), British television actor
Richard Walsh (Australian publisher) (born 1941), Australian publisher and one of the original co-editors of 1960s satirical magazine Oz
Richard Walsh (English politician), High Sheriff of Worcestershire
Richard Walsh (fighter) (born 1988), martial artist
Richard Walsh (Irish politician) (1889–1957), Irish Fianna Fáil politician, TD for Mayo South
Richard A. Walsh (1930–2005), American politician
Richard Ambrose Walsh (1862-1949), American politician and lawyer
Richard Hussey Walsh (1825–1862), Irish political economist and colonial official
Dick Walsh (1877–1958), Irish hurler
Dick Walsh (executive) (1925–2011), sporting executive
Richard Walsh (IATSE), former president of the International Alliance of Theatrical Stage Employees (IATSE)
Richard J. Walsh (1887–1960), New York publisher, founder of John Day Company
Dick Walsh (journalist), Irish journalist for Fortnight Magazine

Fictional 
Richard Walsh (24 character), from television's 24